N6 may refer to:

Roads
 N6 (Bangladesh)
 N6 road (Belgium), a National Road in Belgium connecting Brussels over Halle, Soignies, and Mons
 N6 road (France)
 N6 road (Gabon)
 N6 road (Ghana)
 N6 road (Ireland)
 N6 road (Luxembourg)
 N6 road (Senegal)
 N6 road (South Africa), a national road connecting East London and Bloemfontein
 N6 road (Switzerland)

Other
 N6 (Long Island bus)
 N6, a postcode district in the N postcode area
 SP&S Class N-6, a steam locomotives class
 USS N-6 (SS-58), a 1917 N-class coastal defense submarine of the United States Navy
 Neapolitan sixth, a chord in music
 N6, the chemical formula of hexazine
 N6, the molecular formula of a high pressure nitrogen form
 LNER Class N6, a class of British steam locomotives

See also
N06 may refer to :
 ATC code N06 Psychoanaleptics, a subgroup of the Anatomical Therapeutic Chemical Classification System
 Isolated proteinuria with specified morphological lesion ICD-10 code
 Laurel Airport (Delaware), FAA Location Identifier: N06
 N°6, a shortening for Number Six